Enter or ENTER may refer to:

 Enter key, on computer keyboards
 Enter, Netherlands, a village
 Enter (magazine), an American technology magazine for children 1983–1985
 Enter (Finnish magazine), a Finnish computer magazine
 Enter Air, a Polish airline
 Equivalent National Tertiary Entrance Rank, an Australian school student assessment
Entertain

Music
 Enter (Cybotron album) or the title song, 1983
 Enter (Russian Circles album) or the title song, 2006
 Enter (Within Temptation album) or the title song, 1997
 Enter, an album by Bin-Jip, 2010
 Enter, an album by DJ Kentaro, 2007

See also
 
 Entrance (disambiguation)
 Entry (disambiguation)
 Access (disambiguation)